The Ministry of Finance is the Estonian government department responsible for the implementation of tax, financial and fiscal policies, and setting economic goals.

Areas of activity of ministry 
 planning and implementation of the state’s fiscal policy;
 planning tax and customs policy, and maintaining a stable tax system;
 economic analysis and economic forecast;
 development of the public service;
 reviewing applications for permits for aid granted by the state to business (state aid) and advising aid donors;
 advising suppliers and tenderers on carrying out public procurement and supervising public procurement;
 collection of national statistics;
 organising and coordinating the implementation of the government’s internal control system and the professional activities of internal auditors;
 state accountancy;
 allocating the state’s financial assets and liabilities, foreign aid and loans granted to the state;
 coordinating the aid available to Estonia;
 financial and insurance policy;
 planning and coordinating the state’s real estate and participation policy.

See also 
Minister of Finance
Minister of Public Administration

References

External links 
Ministry of Finance

Finance
Estonia